Volker Summer (born June 2, 1954) is a German author, anthropologist, and Professor of Evolutionary Anthropology at University College London (UCL). His research focusses on the evolution of primate social and sexual behaviour, cognition, rituals, biodiversity conservation, animal rights and evolutionary ethics.

Life 
Sommer was born in Holzhausen, Kassel.  In his youth, he was a winner of the German national competition Jugend forscht (Youth Research, or Young Scientist) with his 1973 thesis on the social behavior of caterpillars. After completing his high-school education, he studied biology, chemistry and theology in Göttingen, Marburg, Berlin and Hamburg. Since 1981, he has been involved in a long-term study of Hanuman langurs in India. Between 1986 and 1988 he was the recipient of a scholarship from the Alexander von Humboldt Foundation. Sommer was awarded his doctorate in 1985, and his habilitation in 1990. In 1990 he took part in a multi-year study of gibbons in the forests of Thailand. After this was completed, he taught private Anthropology and Primatology lessons at the University of Göttingen. He also received the Heisenberg Scholarship from the German Research Foundation between 1991 and 1996, and was a researcher at the University of California in Davis.

Since 1996, Sommer has lectured on Evolutionary Anthropology at University College London. He has also led an international project to study the chimpanzees in the forests of Nigeria.

Sommer has published approximately 100 works on the biology of social and sexual behaviour, as well as several works of fiction. His works have been translated into several languages including English, Spanish, Italian, Wallonian, Korean, and Hindi. He regularly writes articles for magazines such as Geo, Stern, the Frankfurter Allgemeine Zeitung (Frankfurt General Times), Nature, Kosmos, Die Zeit, Der Spiegel, Die Welt, Die Weltwoche and Neue Zürcher Zeitung. He also takes part in radio, film, and television programmes, often as a panelist discussing his unusual research methods, or to give lectures. In October 2013 he appeared on BBC Radio 4's Museum of Curiosity, where he 'donated' 10 defecated ant heads to the collection.

Sommer is a member of the Scientific Advisory Board of the Giordano Bruno Foundation

Works (abridged)

Solo works 
 Nektar der Unsterblichkeit. Poetische Annäherung an Indien. Radius-Verlag, Stuttgart 1983, .
 Yeti. Eine Erzählung. Stuttgart 1986.
 Die Rose. Entfaltung eines Symbols. Köln 1988; (with Gerd Heinz-Mohr).
 Die Affen. Unsere wilde Verwandtschaft. Hamburg 1989.
 Wider die Natur? Homosexualität und Evolution. München 1990.
 Lob der Lüge. Täuschung und Selbstbetrug bei Tier und Mensch. München 1992, .
 Feste – Mythen – Rituale. Warum die Völker feiern. Hamburg 1992.
 Heilige Egoisten. Die Soziobiologie indischer Tempelaffen. München 1996.
 Die großen Menschenaffen. Orang-Utans, Gorillas, Bonobos, Schimpansen. München 1998; (with Karl Ammann).
 Von Menschen und anderen Tieren. Essays zur Evolutionsbiologie. Stuttgart 1999.
 Das grüne All. Ein Poem aus dem Regenwald. Stuttgart 2002.
 Darwinisch denken. Horizonte der Evolutionsbiologie. S. Hirzel Verlag, Stuttgart 2007.
 Schimpansenland; Wildes Leben in Afrika. C.H. Beck 2008, .

Editor 
 Biologie des Menschen, Heidelberg 1996.

Audiobooks 
 Schon gewusst? Wissenschaftler erklären Kindern die Welt – Folge 1: Wörter unter der Lupe / Warum Affen lügen können; Audiobook (with Werner Schäfer).

Filmography (abridged) 
 Faszination Wissen – Strategien der Liebe – Väter, Mütter, Steinzeit-Babys. Film by Felix Heidinger and Volker Sommer produced for Sender Bayerisches TV.

Documentaries 
 Volker Sommer – Ich bin ein Menschenaffe. TV Documentary, RB 2009, 43 minutes, first broadcast by Arte on April 17, 2011 (Broadcast information  at RB; Broadcast information  with Streaming Media from Arte).

References

External links 
 
 
  
 
  
 
 

1954 births
Scientists from Kassel
German anthropologists
Academics of University College London
German essayists
Living people
German male essayists